The 2008–09 Copa Federación de España was the 16th staging of the Copa Federación de España, a knockout competition for Spanish football clubs in Segunda División B and Tercera División.

The competition began on 2 August 2008 and ended with the finals on 2 April and 15 April 2009, where Real Jaén became champion after defeating Rayo Vallecano B 4-1 on aggregate.

Autonomous Communities tournaments

Andalusia tournament

Final

|}

Asturias tournament

Qualifying tournament

Group A

Group B

Group C

Group D

Semifinals

|}

Final

Aragon tournament

Quarter-finals

|}

Semifinals

|}

Final

|}

Balearic Islands tournament

Semifinals

|}

Final

|}

Canary Islands tournament

Semifinals

|}

Final

|}

Cantabria tournament

Semifinals

|}

Final

|}

Castile and León tournament

Qualifying round

Semifinals

Final

Castile-La Mancha tournament

Quarter-finals

|}

Semifinals

|}

Final

|}

Catalonia tournament

Qualifying round

|}

Final

|}

Euskadi tournament

Final

Extremadura tournament

Qualifying round

Quarterfinals

Semifinal

Final

Galicia tournament

Qualifying round

|}

Semifinals

|}

Final

|}

La Rioja tournament

Semifinals

Final

Madrid tournament

Final

Murcia tournament

Quarter-finals

|}

Semifinals

|}

Final

Navarre tournament

Qualifying tournament

Group A

Group B

|}

Final

Valencia tournament

Semifinal

|}

Final

|}

National tournament

National Qualifying round

|}

Round of 32

|}

Round of 16

|}

Quarterfinals

|}

Semifinals

|}

Final

|}

Copa Federación de España seasons
Fed
Copa
Copa